Sine Missione is the first album by Dutch Pagan folk band Omnia, recorded in 1999 and released in 2000. It was supposed to be an archeologically and historically promotional CD and not to be used for the popular market. It contains constructions of Roman and Gallo-Roman music. At this point Omnia was a theatre group (combat and ritual performances) of 8 to 14 people.

The CD is a collectors' item since there were only 150 pieces released.

For the recording, crystals where placed in the microphones. This unique concept was developed by Norbert Veel (Liessel, NL). It gives a "unique sonic and emotional fidelity unknown in most modern recordings"

Track listing
 Sacrificium
 Flora
 Telethusa
 Nox
 Morrigan
 Odi et Amo
 Tartarus
 Morpheus
 Lesbia
 Mars
 Cernunnos
 Iuno
 Gaudia
 Isis
 Priapus
 Rufa solo

References

External links
 Official Website
 Omnia on Wikipedia
 Sine Missione tracks on SoundCloud

2000 debut albums